= V. R. Khajuria =

Indian Sculptor, (1934 – 1990)

V.R. Khajuria (5 December 1934 – 5 December 1990) was an artist and sculptor. He served in the department of Sculptor in Institute of Music & Fine Arts, Jammu. He was born in Jammu, Gurah, Salathia.
